Prototheora drackensbergae is a species of moth of the family Prototheoridae. It is found in South Africa, where it is known only from the type locality east of the Drakensberg escarpment in KwaZulu-Natal.

The wingspan is about 20.3 mm.

Etymology
The specific name is derived from the genitive form of the general type locality, the Drakensberg mountains.

References

Endemic moths of South Africa
Hepialoidea
Moths of Africa
Moths described in 1996
Taxa named by Donald R. Davis (entomologist)